Josh Whitehouse (born 27 February 1990 in Chester, United Kingdom) is an English actor, musician and artist. He is known for the BBC series Poldark, and starring roles in Northern Soul and the Valley Girl remake. He was originally set to play an unspecified leading role in the unproduced Game of Thrones prequel series. He co-starred with Vanessa Hudgens in the Netflix Christmas film The Knight Before Christmas (2019).

Filmography

Film

Television

References

External links
 

1990 births
Living people
Actors from London
British actors